The 1917–18 Indiana State Sycamores men's basketball team represented Indiana State University during the 1917–18 college men's basketball season. The head coach was O. E. Sink, coaching the Fightin' Teachers in his sole season. The team played their home games at North Hall in Terre Haute, Indiana.

Schedule

|-

References

Indiana State Sycamores men's basketball seasons
Indiana State
Indiana State
Indiana State